Jan Swołyński (died between 1644 and 1647) was a Polish nobleman (szlachcic) and a marshal (marszałek) of Oszmiany.

He was son of Jan, a Protestant. He was connected with Radziwiłł family. Jan Swołyński was an official of Janusz Radziwiłł in Kopysia and Smolewicze. After death of Janusz Radziwiłł (1620) Swołyński went under a patronage of Krzysztof Radziwiłł, a half-brother of Janusz. During the campaign in Livonia in 1622 he was an adjutant of K. Radziwiłł. As a porucznik of hussar's chorągiew he fought in war with Sweden in 1625 and 1626.

Before 8 December 1642 Swołyński was nominated on marshal of Oszmiany by king Władysław IV.

Footnotes

References

17th-century Polish nobility
Members of the Sejm of the Polish–Lithuanian Commonwealth
17th-century deaths